Krissy Matthews (born 25 May 1992) is a British-Norwegian blues rock singer-songwriter and guitarist.  He had released three albums by the age of 18. His most recent and fifth album, Scenes From a Moving Window, was released by Promise Records in 2015.

Amongst a number of accolades, the young blues guitarist was once described by Hubert Sumlin as "…Oh Boy, this kid can play…"

Life and career
Matthews was bought his first electric guitar for his eighth birthday, and his father taught him the rudiments by playing songs by The Shadows.  Matthews' musical taste altered after hearing Amund Maarud, whilst on holiday in Norway. He got backstage at a John Mayall concert and gave Mayall a demo, which included Matthews' version of Otis Rush's "All Your Love (I Miss Loving)". Mayall invited Matthews to sit in on that song in the encore. This led to Matthews giving several media interviews. He returned to Norway in October 2004, where he appeared on God Morgen Norge, Norway's national breakfast television program.  He also undertook a radio session with Knut Reiersrud for Blues Asylet on NRK P2, and performed live with Larry Burton in a concert which was shown on national TV.

Upon his return to the UK, Matthews set up his first band, Krissy's Blues Boys, before reducing the line-up to a three piece with Matthews playing bass guitar. In July 2005, he recorded his first album, Influences at the age of 13. This was renamed Blues Boy for a wider release after he secured a recording contract with Via Music. During March 2006, Matthews met B.B. King backstage. In Norway, he appeared God Morgen Norge again and undertook more media interviews. Blues Matters! ran a feature on him, which led to the recording of No Age Limit (2007). His band then performed at the Blues Autour Du Zinc Festival in Beauvais, France. Matthews later performed on stage in May 2007 with Jeff Healey. The band toured Europe, supported Walter Trout in Oslo, and then had three shows supporting Robben Ford. Matthews left school in May 2008 and, in September that year, performed at the Festa Avante in Lisbon, Portugal. In July 2008, Matthews performed at the Canal Street Festival in Arendal, Aust-Agder, Norway.

Allen in Reverse was recorded in January 2009, which led to Matthews supporting Joe Bonamassa at Ronnie Scott's Jazz Club. He recorded for BBC Radio 2, and had a song included on a  Classic Rock compilation album. Allen in Reverse was released in September, before Matthew's ensemble recorded at BBC's Maida Vale Studios. In 2010, Matthews toured in Europe and recorded his fourth album, Hit the Rock, in Oxford, England.  It was released in April the following year.

Touring took place in 2011 and 2012 across Europe, and included performances at both the Majorca Jazz Festival and Burlada Blues Festival. He and his band also opened for Tedeschi Trucks Band, Gregg Allman, Beth Hart, Los Lobos, Ten Years After and Toto in that period. After meeting Pete Brown in Germany in September 2012, Brown co-wrote eleven songs for Scenes from A Moving Window, which also included a cover of Blind Willie McTell's "Searching the Desert for The Blues". Brown produced the album and it was released in March 2015 on Promise Records.

In January 2016, the Hamburg Blues Band featuring Maggie Bell and Krissy Matthews, performed at the Quasimodo Club in Berlin, Germany. In February 2016, Matthews and his band played at The Giants of Rock Festival at Butlin's Minehead, Somerset, England. Matthews continued to tour the UK in 2016.

Discography

Albums

See also
List of electric blues musicians

References

External links
Official website
Concert review
Concert footage on Youtube

1992 births
Living people
British blues singers
Norwegian male singers
British blues guitarists
Norwegian blues guitarists
Electric blues musicians
Blues rock musicians
Norwegian singer-songwriters
British male singer-songwriters
British people of Norwegian descent
21st-century British singers
21st-century Norwegian singers
21st-century Norwegian guitarists
21st-century British male singers
Proper Records artists